Roman Brian Fortin (born February 26, 1967) is a former NFL player from 1991–2000. He played center, guard, offensive tackle, tackle, and tight end through the course of his career. He was the quarterback for his high school team at Ventura High School. He played the first part of his college football career at Oregon State University, and later transferred to San Diego State. He was selected in the 1990 NFL Draft by the Detroit Lions. He played with them in the 1991 season, but would end up being picked up by the Atlanta Falcons in 1992. He stayed there through the 1997 season, where he would then play for the San Diego Chargers for his last three seasons. Roman Fortin has five children. They are Roman Jr., Dillon, Simone, Bradon, and Turner.

He now lives in Atlanta, Georgia, and is part owner of The Forum Athletic Club. Roman's sister Robyn is married to Steve Bartkowski's first son, Philip.

References

External links
Roman Fortin stats

1967 births
Living people
American football tight ends
Atlanta Falcons players
Detroit Lions players
Oregon State Beavers football players
Players of American football from California
San Diego State Aztecs football players
San Diego Chargers players
Sportspeople from Ventura County, California